Phaeocedus is a genus of ground spiders that was first described by Eugène Simon in 1893.

Species
 it contains five species and one subspecies:
Phaeocedus braccatus (L. Koch, 1866) (type) – Europe, Turkey, Caucasus, Russia (Europe to Far East), Iran, Kazakhstan, Central Asia, China, Japan
Phaeocedus b. jugorum Simon, 1914 – France
Phaeocedus fedotovi Charitonov, 1946 – Uzbekistan
Phaeocedus hebraeus Levy, 1999 – Greece, Cyprus, Israel
Phaeocedus mikha Levy, 2009 – Israel, Portugal
Phaeocedus vankeeri Chatzaki, 2019 – France (incl. Corsica), Greece (Rhodes, Symi)

References

Araneomorphae genera
Gnaphosidae
Spiders of Asia
Taxa named by Eugène Simon